This page lists the winners and nominees for the Soul Train Music Award for Best Dance Performance. This category was created during the 2010 ceremony and since its creation, Ciara and Chris Brown are the only artists to win the award thrice.

Winners and nominees
Winners are listed first and highlighted in bold.

2010s

2020s

See also
 Soul Train Music Award for Best R&B/Soul or Rap Dance Cut

References

Soul Train Music Awards
Song awards